Bardu Chaina is a village in Loharu Tehsil of Bhiwani district in Haryana, India.

References

External links
 Bardu Chaina
 Haryana Government e-Services
 Bhiwani District Website
 e-Disha e-services
 Government of India e-services

Villages in Bhiwani district